Discoverer may refer to:

Ships
 MS World Discoverer cruise ship wrecked off the Solomon Islands in 2000
 Discoverer Clear Leader double-hulled dynamically-positioned drillship (2007), sister ships are
 Discoverer Americas
 Discoverer Inspiration
 Discoverer Luanda
 Discoverer India
 Discoverer Enterprise double-hulled dynamically-positioned drillship (1999), sister ships are
 Discoverer Spirit 
 Discoverer Deep Seas
 Silver Discoverer cruise ship
 Coral Discoverer cruise ship
 USC&GS Discoverer, the name of two ships of the United States Coast and Geodetic Survey

Other uses
 Discoverer program, the initial name of the Corona satellite program, including a list of satellites named Discoverer
 The Discoverer, a novel by Norwegian author Jan Kjærstad
 "Discoverer" (R.E.M. song)
 The Discoverers, a non-fiction book
 The Discoverers, film directed and written by Justin Schwarz
 "Discoverer", a song on the album Collapse into Now by R.E.M.
 Discoverer Seamount, an undersea geographic feature named after NOAAS Discoverer (R 102)
 Oracle Discoverer software

See also
 
 Discover (disambiguation)
 Discovery (disambiguation)
 Once Upon a Time... The Discoverers, French animated TV series